The Slavery Abolition Act 1833 (3 & 4 Will. IV c. 73) was an Act of the Parliament of the United Kingdom which provided for the gradual abolition of slavery in most parts of the British Empire. It was passed by Earl Grey's reforming administration and expanded the jurisdiction of the Slave Trade Act 1807 and made the purchase or ownership of slaves illegal within the British Empire, with the exception of "the Territories in the Possession of the East India Company", Ceylon (now Sri Lanka), and Saint Helena. The Act was repealed in 1998 as a part of wider rationalisation of English statute law; however, later anti-slavery legislation remains in force.

Background
There is a long history of efforts to end or limit the practice of slavery. In 1080, William the Conqueror banned the slave trade between Bristol and Ireland upon the urging of Bishop Wulfstan of Worcester. In 1102, the ecclesiastical Council of London condemned the slave trade within England, decreeing “Let no one dare hereafter to engage in the infamous business … of selling men like animals.”  

In May 1772, Lord Mansfield's judgment in the Somerset case emancipated a slave in England and thus helped launch the movement to abolish slavery. The case ruled that slavery had no legal status in England as it had no common law or statutory law basis, and as such someone could not legally be a slave in England. However, many campaigners, including Granville Sharp, took the view that the ratio decidendi of the Somerset case meant that slavery was unsupported by law within England and that no ownership could be exercised on slaves entering English or Scottish soil. In 1785, English poet William Cowper wrote:

We have no slaves at home – Then why abroad?Slaves cannot breathe in England; if their lungsReceive our air, that moment they are free.They touch our country, and their shackles fall.That's noble, and bespeaks a nation proud.And jealous of the blessing. Spread it then,And let it circulate through every vein.

Campaigns 

By 1783, an anti-slavery movement to abolish the slave trade throughout the Empire had begun among the British public, with the Society for Effecting the Abolition of the Slave Trade being established in 1787. Spurred by an incident involving Chloe Cooley, a slave brought to Canada by an American loyalist, the Lieutenant-Governor of Upper Canada, John Graves Simcoe, tabled the Act Against Slavery in 1793. Passed by the local Legislative Assembly, it was the first legislation to outlaw the slave trade in a part of the British Empire.

The British were, by the late eighteenth century, the biggest proponents of the abolition of slavery worldwide, having previously been the world's largest slave dealers. William Wilberforce had written in his diary in 1787 that his great purpose in life was to suppress the slave trade before waging a 20-year fight on the industry.

In 1807, Parliament passed the Slave Trade Act of 1807, which outlawed the international slave trade, but not slavery itself. The legislation was timed to coincide with the expected Act Prohibiting Importation of Slaves by the United States, Britain's chief rival in maritime commerce. This legislation imposed fines that did little to deter slave trade participants. Abolitionist Henry Brougham realised that trading had continued, and as a new MP successfully introduced the Slave Trade Felony Act 1811 which at last made the overseas slave trade a felony throughout the empire. The Royal Navy established the West Africa Squadron to suppress the Atlantic slave trade by patrolling the coast of West Africa. It did suppress the slave trade, but did not stop it entirely. Between 1808 and 1860, the West Africa Squadron captured 1,600 slave ships and freed 150,000 Africans. They resettled many in Jamaica and the Bahamas. Britain also used its influence to coerce other countries to agree to treaties to end their slave trade and allow the Royal Navy to seize their slave ships.

Between 1807 and 1823, abolitionists showed little interest in abolishing slavery itself. Eric Williams presented economic data in Capitalism and Slavery to show that the slave trade itself generated only small profits compared to the much more lucrative sugar plantations of the Caribbean, and therefore slavery continued to thrive on those estates. However, from 1823 the British Caribbean sugar industry went into terminal decline, and the British parliament no longer felt they needed to protect the economic interests of the West Indian sugar planters.

In 1823, the Anti-Slavery Society was founded in London. Members included Joseph Sturge, Thomas Clarkson, William Wilberforce, Henry Brougham, Thomas Fowell Buxton, Elizabeth Heyrick, Mary Lloyd, Jane Smeal, Elizabeth Pease, and Anne Knight. Jamaican mixed-race campaigners such as Louis Celeste Lecesne and Richard Hill were also members of the Anti-Slavery Society.

During the Christmas holiday of 1831, a large-scale slave revolt in Jamaica, known as the Baptist War, broke out. It was organised originally as a peaceful strike by the Baptist minister Samuel Sharpe. The rebellion was suppressed by the militia of the Jamaican plantocracy and the British garrison ten days later in early 1832. Because of the loss of property and life in the 1831 rebellion, the British Parliament held two inquiries. The results of these inquiries contributed greatly to the abolition of slavery with the Slavery Abolition Act 1833.

Up until then, sugar planters from rich British islands such as the Colony of Jamaica and Barbados were able to buy rotten and pocket boroughs, and they were able to form a body of resistance to moves to abolish slavery itself. This West India Lobby, which later evolved into the West India Committee, purchased enough seats to be able to resist the overtures of abolitionists. However, The Reform Act 1832 swept away their rotten borough seats, clearing the way for a majority of members of the House of Commons to push through a law to abolish slavery itself throughout the British Empire.

The Act

The Act passed its second reading in the House of Commons unopposed on 22 July 1833, just a week before William Wilberforce died. It received the Royal Assent a month later, on 28 August, and came into force the following year, on 1 August 1834. In practical terms, only slaves below the age of six were freed in the colonies. Former slaves over the age of six were redesignated as "apprentices", and their servitude was gradually abolished in two stages: the first set of apprenticeships came to an end on 1 August 1838, while the final apprenticeships were scheduled to cease on 1 August 1840. The Act specifically excluded "the Territories in the Possession of the East India Company, or to the Island of Ceylon, or to the Island of Saint Helena." The exceptions were eliminated in 1843.

Payments to slave owners 

The Act provided for payments to slave-owners. The amount of money to be spent on the payments was set at "the Sum of Twenty Million Pounds Sterling". Under the terms of the Act, the British government raised £20 million to pay out for the loss of the slaves as business assets to the registered owners of the freed slaves. In 1833, £20 million amounted to 40% of the Treasury's annual income or approximately 5% of British GDP at the time. To finance the payments, the British government took on a £15 million loan, finalised on 3 August 1835, with banker Nathan Mayer Rothschild and his brother-in-law Moses Montefiore;  £5 million was paid out directly in government stock, worth £1.5 billion in present day.

There have been claims the money was not paid back by the British taxpayers until 2015, however this claim is based on a technicality as to how the British Government financed their debt though undated gilts. According to the Treasury the slave debts could have been paid off as early as 1833 or anytime before 1927 as no records of gilt redemptions before 1927 exist. It was only when the British government modernised the gilt portfolio in 2015 by redeeming all remaining undated gilts was there complete certainty that the debt was paid off. The long gap between this money being borrowed and certainty of repayment was due to the type of financial instrument that was used, rather than the amount of money borrowed.

Half of the money went to slave-owning families in the Caribbean and Africa, while the other half went to absentee owners living in Britain. The names listed in the returns for slave owner payments show that ownership was spread over many hundreds of British families, many of them (though not all) of high social standing. For example, Henry Phillpotts (then the Bishop of Exeter), with three others (as trustees and executors of the will of John Ward, 1st Earl of Dudley), was paid £12,700 for 665 slaves in the West Indies, whilst Henry Lascelles, 2nd Earl of Harewood received £26,309 for 2,554 slaves on 6 plantations. The majority of men and women who were paid under the 1833 Abolition Act are listed in a Parliamentary Return, entitled Slavery Abolition Act, which is an account of all moneys awarded by the Commissioners of Slave Compensation in the Parliamentary Papers 1837–8 (215) vol. 48.

Exceptions and continuations 
As a notable exception to the rest of the British Empire, the Act did not extend to any of the territories administered by the East India Company, including the islands of Ceylon, and Saint Helena, in which the company had been independently regulating, and in part prohibiting the slave trade since 1774; with regulations prohibiting the enslavement, the sale without a written deed, and the transport of slaves into company territory prohibited over the period. The Indian Slavery Act, 1843 went on to prohibit company employees from owning, or dealing in slaves, along with granting limited protection under the law, that included the ability for a slave to own, transfer or inherit property, notionally benefitting the 8 to 10 million that were estimated to exist in company territory, to quote Rev. Howard Malcom:

A successor organisation to the Anti-Slavery Society was formed in London in 1839, the British and Foreign Anti-Slavery Society, which worked to outlaw slavery worldwide. The world's oldest international human rights organisation, it continues today as Anti-Slavery International.

Clandestine slave trading still continued within the British Empire despite its illegality. In 1854, Nathaniel Isaacs, owner of the island of Matakong off the coast of Sierra Leone, was accused of slave trading by the governor of Sierra Leone, Sir Arthur Kennedy. Papers relating to the charges were lost when the Forerunner was wrecked off Madeira in October 1854. Due to the absence of the papers, the English courts refused to proceed with the prosecution.

The Act also did not outlaw other forms of forced labour like indentured servitude and blackbirding.

Modern slavery, both in the form of human trafficking and people imprisoned for forced or compulsory labour, continues to this day.

Protests against apprenticeships 
On 1 August 1834, an unarmed group of mainly elderly people being addressed by the governor at Government House in Port of Spain, Trinidad, about the new laws, began chanting: "Pas de six ans. Point de six ans" ("Not six years. No six years"), drowning out the voice of the governor. Peaceful protests continued until a resolution to abolish apprenticeship was passed and de facto freedom was achieved. Full emancipation for all was legally granted ahead of schedule on 1 August 1838.

Repeal

The Slavery Abolition Act 1833 was repealed in its entirety by the Statute Law (Repeals) Act 1998. The repeal has not made slavery legal again, sections of the Slave Trade Act 1824, Slave Trade Act 1843 and Slave Trade Act 1873 continuing in force. In its place the Human Rights Act 1998 incorporates into British Law Article 4 of the European Convention on Human Rights which prohibits the holding of persons as slaves.

In popular culture
Ava DuVernay was commissioned by the Smithsonian's National Museum of African American History and Culture to create a film which debuted at the museum's opening on 24 September 2016. This film, 28 August: A Day in the Life of a People, tells of six significant events in African-American history that happened on the same date, 28 August. Events depicted include (among others) William IV's royal assent to the Slavery Abolition Act.

Amazing Grace is a 2006 British-American biographical drama film directed by Michael Apted, about the campaign against the slave trade in the British Empire, led by William Wilberforce, who was responsible for steering anti-slave trade legislation through the British parliament. The title is a reference to the 1772 hymn "Amazing Grace". The film also recounts the experiences of John Newton as a crewman on a slave ship and subsequent religious conversion, which inspired his writing of the poem later used in the hymn. Newton is portrayed as a major influence on Wilberforce and the abolition movement.

The Act is referenced in the 2010 novel The Long Song by British author Andrea Levy and in the 2018 BBC television adaptation of the same name. The novel and television series tell the story of a slave in colonial Jamaica who lives through the period of slavery abolition in the British West Indies.

See also

 1926 Slavery Convention from which an international treaty resulted
 Act Against Slavery, an act in Upper Canada that banned the importation of slaves there in 1793
 Blockade of Africa
 Brussels Conference Act of 1890, an early abolitionist treaty
 Centre for the Study of the Legacies of British Slavery
 Indian Slavery Act, 1843
 Slave Trade Acts
 Slavery in Britain
 Thirteenth Amendment to the United States Constitution which ended slavery in the United States in 1865
 Timeline of abolition of slavery and serfdom

References

Further reading
 Drescher, Seymour. Abolition: A History of Slavery and Antislavery (2009)
 Hinks, Peter, and John McKivigan, eds. Encyclopedia of Antislavery and Abolition (2 vol. 2006) 
 Huzzey, Richard. Freedom Burning: Anti-Slavery and Empire in Victorian Britain. (Cornell University Press, 2012) 303pp. 
 Washington, Jon-Michael. "Ending the Slave Trade and Slavery in the British Empire: An Explanatory Case Study Utilizing Qualitative Methodology and Stratification and Class Theories." (2012 NCUR) (2013). online

External links
Text of the Slavery Abolition Act 1833
Legacies of British slave-ownership is a database of the Parliamentary return of people who made claims for compensation under this act

 
United Kingdom Acts of Parliament 1833
Abolitionism in the United Kingdom
Slavery legislation
Slave trade legislation
August 1833 events
Black British history